The Owen River is located in the northwest of New Zealand's South Island. This short river is an upper tributary of the Buller River. It flows south for 20 kilometres from its headwaters on the slopes of Mount Owen, flowing into the Buller at the small settlement of Owen River 18 kilometres northeast of Murchison.

Rivers of the Tasman District
Rivers of New Zealand